Duke of San Miguel is a hereditary title in the peerage of Spain, accompanied by the dignity of Grandee and granted in 1625 by Philip IV to Juan Gravina y Cruyllas, viceroy of Sicily.

The title became vacant for more than 200 years until Francisco Franco rehabilitated it in 1956 on behalf of Juan Castillejo y Ussía, 6th Count of Floridablanca and a descendant of the 2nd duke.

Federico Gravina, the Spanish admiral during the Battle of Trafalgar, was a son of the 1st Duke of San Miguel.

Disambiguation

In 1855 Isabella II granted a dukedom with the same name to Evaristo Fernández de San Miguel, Captain general of the Army, with no relation to the present dukedom. Because the original Dukedom of San Miguel had been granted in the Kingdom of Sicily, it was not registered under Spain's peerage.

Dukes of San Miguel (1625)

Juan Gravina y Cruilles, 1st Duke of San Miguel
Juan Gravina y Requesens, 2nd Duke of San Miguel

Dukes of San Miguel (1956)

Juan Castillejo y Ussía, 3rd Duke of San Miguel
Juan Bautista Castillejo y Oriol, 4th Duke of San Miguel

See also
List of dukes in the peerage of Spain
List of current Grandees of Spain

References

Bibliography
 
 

Dukedoms of Spain
Grandees of Spain
Lists of dukes
Lists of Spanish nobility